Pavel Novotný (born 14 September 1973 in Kroměříž) is a Czech former professional football who played as a defensive midfielder. He made two appearances for the Czech Republic, with which he participated at the UEFA Euro 1996 in England. During his career he played at a number of clubs including Union Cheb, SK Slavia Prague, VfL Wolfsburg, AC Sparta Prague, FC Bohemians Praha and SC Xaverov. In present time, he is a coach at Bohemians Praha.

References

External links
 

Living people
1973 births
People from Kroměříž
Association football midfielders
Czechoslovak footballers
Czech footballers
Czech Republic under-21 international footballers
UEFA Euro 1996 players
Czech Republic international footballers
SK Slavia Prague players
AC Sparta Prague players
VfL Wolfsburg players
Czech expatriate footballers
Expatriate footballers in Germany
Bundesliga players
Czech First League players
Sportspeople from the Zlín Region